Leptolalax heteropus (Malaysian Asian toad or variable litter frog) is a frog species in the family Megophryidae. It is found in the Malay Peninsula, both in Malaysia and southern Thailand. The type locality is Maxwell Hill in Taiping, Perak, Malaysia. Its natural habitats are tropical moist lowland forests, moist montane forests, and rivers. It is not considered threatened by the IUCN.

These frogs are usually encountered while perched on the leaves of small plants close the ground. The call of male L. heteropus is short and consists of a short series of 3–6 notes, the first note being longer in duration and higher in dominant frequency than subsequent ones. The call characteristics are among the features that separate this species from superficially similar Leptolalax solus. Indeed, frogs reported from Thailand as Leptolalax heteropus might actually be the relatively recently (2006) described L. solus.

References

External links
 Sound recordings of Leptolalax heteropus at BioAcoustica

heteropus
Amphibians of Malaysia
Amphibians of Thailand
Amphibians described in 1900
Taxonomy articles created by Polbot
Taxobox binomials not recognized by IUCN